KLTJ (channel 22) is a  religious television station licensed to Galveston, Texas, United States, serving the Houston area as an owned-and-operated station of the Daystar Television Network.  The station's transmitter is located near Missouri City, in unincorporated northeastern Fort Bend County.

History
The station was originally licensed to Galveston Educational TV, Inc. under the call sign KUYA; it is unknown whether the station ever went on the air under those call letters.

On July 20, 1989, Eldred Thomas moved the KLTJ religious programming inventory and call sign from channel 57 (frequency now occupied by KUBE-TV) to channel 22 to take advantage of an improved coverage area.

Before moving the call letters to Houston, Thomas owned KLTJ (channel 49, now KSTR-DT) in Dallas from 1983 to 1987; it was a sister station to radio outlet KVTT-FM (now KKXT), which Thomas also owned.

Digital television

Digital channels
The station's digital signal is multiplexed:

Analog-to-digital conversion
KLTJ discontinued regular programming on its analog signal, over UHF channel 22, on June 12, 2009, the official date in which full-power television stations in the United States transitioned from analog to digital broadcasts under federal mandate. The station's digital signal remained on its pre-transition UHF channel 23, using PSIP to display KLTJ's virtual channel as 22 on digital television receivers.

References

External links

Daystar (TV network) affiliates
LTJ
Television channels and stations established in 1989
Mass media in Galveston, Texas
1989 establishments in Texas